Le Corsaire ("The Pirate") is an unfinished 1939 French film. It would have marked the screen debut of Louis Jourdan.

Plot
Some actors put on a play about a pirate, and find themselves encountering similarities from the play in their own lives.

Production
Charles Boyer returned from Hollywood to appear in the movie which was filmed at Victorine Studios in Nice, August – September 1939. However production ceased on the declaration of war and Boyer returned to America. The film was never completed, although some footage of it was later released.

A documentary about the making of the movie was released in 1995.

References

External links
Le Corsaire at IMDb

1939 films
Films directed by Marc Allégret
French black-and-white films
1930s unfinished films
1930s French films